Proacerella vasconica is a species of proturan in the family Acerentomidae. It is found in Europe and Northern Asia (excluding China).

References

Further reading

 

Protura
Articles created by Qbugbot
Animals described in 1983